Pape Seydou N'Diaye (born 11 February 1993) is a Senegalese professional footballer who currently plays as a goalkeeper for Danish 2nd Division club Jammerbugt FC.

Career

Club
Since 2012 N'Diaye has played in ASC Niarry Tally.	

On 3 November 2021, N'Diaye joined Danish 1st Division club Jammerbugt FC on a deal until June 2023.

International
Following his selection for the Olympic Games, N'Diaye took part 2015 Africa U-23 Cup of Nations in his native country. Senegal came fourth in the tournament after losing the semifinals to Nigeria and the final for third place to South Africa. 

N'Diaye played his first match for Senegal's senior team on 10 February 2016, in a friendly 2–0 defeat against Mexico in Miami. He took part in the 2017 Africa Cup of Nations which took place in Gabon.

References

External links
 
 

1993 births
Living people
Footballers from Dakar
Senegalese footballers
Senegalese expatriate footballers
Senegal international footballers
Senegal youth international footballers
Association football goalkeepers
Senegal Premier League players
Danish 1st Division players
Danish 2nd Division players
ASC Yakaar players
AS Douanes (Senegal) players
ASC Niarry Tally players
Génération Foot players
Jammerbugt FC players
Senegalese expatriate sportspeople in Denmark
Expatriate men's footballers in Denmark